Rosa Sabater i Parera (Barcelona, Spain, 29 August 1929 – Mejorada del Campo, Spain, 27 November 1983) was a Spanish pianist. She was a pupil of Frank Marshall (1883-1959), who headed the Academia Marshall in Barcelona, formerly the Academia Granados.
In 1982 she served on the jury of the Paloma O'Shea Santander International Piano Competition.
She was killed during the air accident of Avianca Flight 011. Rosa Sabater won the Creu de Sant Jordi Prize.

References

1929 births
1983 deaths
Avianca Flight 011 victims
Spanish classical pianists
Spanish women pianists
20th-century classical pianists
20th-century Spanish musicians
20th-century Spanish women
20th-century women pianists